Moulin de Craca is a windmill in Plouézec, Côtes-d'Armor, France. First working in 1844 it was restored from 1995. It is popular amongst both locals and tourists because of its location on top of a cliff overlooking Port Lazo.

Every August the Plouézec-Ballinamore twinning committee organises Noz Ar Vilin Fest Noz around the windmill. There is a selection of Breton and Irish music and dancing, as well as local cuisine and drinks. Amongst the specialities are Moules-Frites (Mussels and chips), Crêpes, Galettes, Breton cider, and Chouchen.

After falling into disrepair, the windmill was restored in 1993. It now contains fully operational, working replica machinery.

References

External links

Moulin de Craca website 

Buildings and structures in Côtes-d'Armor
Tower mills
Windmills in France
Tourist attractions in Côtes-d'Armor
Grinding mills in France